The Nā Hōkū Hanohano Awards, occasionally called the Nā Hōkū Awards or Hoku Awards, are the premier music awards in Hawaii. They are considered to be Hawaii's equivalent of the Grammy Awards. "Nā Hōkū Hanohano" means "Stars of Distinction" in Hawaiian – "hōkū" means "star", "nā" makes it plural, and "hanohano" means "glorious, worthy of praises". The awards were founded in 1978 by radio personality Krash Kealoha of KCCN-AM, a radio station which focused on traditional Hawaiian music. He launched the first awards with the support of the owner of the radio station Sydney Grayson, and his fellow DJs Kimo Kaho‘āno and Jacqueline “Skylark” Rossetti.

The award winners are currently selected by the voting members of the non-profit Hawaii Academy of Recording Arts, which was founded in 1982. The awards are presented each May, and the ceremony is televised; KITV was the originating station when it started its telecast. The 38th Annual Nā Hōkū Hanohano Awards were held at the Hawaii Convention Center on May 23, 2015. The event was televised live on KFVE-TV in Hawaii and streamed online worldwide on the station's website.

The 42nd annual Nā Hoku Hanohano Awards were held on Saturday, May 25, 2019 at the Hawaii Convention Center.

Release eligibility, entry and voting

Music recordings must be available for commercial sale through established retailers of physical products (CD and DVD or other media) or through established digital download retailers (such as ITunes, CD Baby, Amazon.com) in order to be eligible for entry in the awards. Recordings that are released during the calendar year (January 1 through December 31) are eligible to be entered in the following year's awards.

Eligibility in most of the award's categories is restricted to Hawaii resident artists and other industry professional, though non-Hawaii U.S. residents are eligible in the Hawaiian, Island Music, Ukulele, Slack Key, Haku Mele, and Hawaiian Language Performance categories. There is a special recognition award for non-U.S. residents who release recordings that prominently feature Hawaiian, Island Music, ukulele, or slack key music.

The Academy solicits entries in fall of the eligibility year, and entries for the awards must be received by January 15 of the year in which the awards will be held. Entrants must complete an online or downloadable entry form and submit copies of the releases to the Academy by that date. Membership in the Academy is not required to enter a release.

The Academy's selection committee assembles a preliminary ballot which is sent to all regular (voting) members, usually in March. The top five vote-getters are tabulated, and the selection committee creates a final ballot, which is also sent to regular members, usually in April. The winners are tabulated by an accounting firm, and remain secret until they are announced at the awards presentation in May.

Awards categories
The Nā Hōkū Hanohano Awards currently present awards in the following categories. A minimum of three eligible releases must be entered in any category in order for that category to be awarded in that year. Unless otherwise noted, eligibility in most categories is restricted to Hawaii residents.

General categories
Album of the Year (Artist and Producerʻs Award):  Best produced album release
EP (Extended Play) of the Year:   Best release that contains more than three but no more than eight separate tracks, and is of less than 30 minutes in total playing time
Single of the Year:  Best Recorded performance of a song released as a single in either physical (CD) or digital format
Song of the Year:  (Composer’s Award) Best achievement in creating a first–time recorded song including words and music
Instrumental Song of the Year:  (Composerʻs Award) Best achievement in creating a first–time recorded instrumental composition
Female Vocalist of the Year:  Best performance by a female artist
Group of the Year:  Best performance by a vocal duo or group
Male Vocalist of the Year:  Best performance by a male artist
Most Promising Artist of the Year:  Most promising first–recorded effort as a featured artist or group
Favorite Entertainer of the Year:  Selected by the general public

Genre categories
Alternative Album of the Year:  Best performance in an alternative style
Anthology of the Year:  Best album of previously released material
Christmas Album of the Year:  Best performance of music with a Christmas theme
Comedy Album or DVD of the Year:  Best comedy performance on an album or DVD
Compilation Album of the Year:  (Producerʻs Award) Best performance of newly released material by a minimum of three distinct artists
Contemporary Album of the Year:  Best performance of music in a contemporary style
Hawaiian Album of the Year:  Best performance of Hawaiian music (non-Hawaii residents eligible)
Hip Hop Album of the Year:  Best performance of music in a hip-hop style
Instrumental Album of the Year:  Best instrumental performance
Island Music Album of the Year:  Best contemporary performance of music of or about Hawaii (non-Hawaii residents eligible)
Jazz Album of the Year:  Best jazz performance
Music Video DVD of the Year:  Best performance of music and video on a DVD
R&B Album of the Year:  Best performance of music in a R&B style
Reggae Album of the Year:  Best reggae performance
Religious Album of the Year:  Best performance of religious material
Rock Album of the Year:  Best rock performance
Slack Key Album of the Year:  Best performance of slack key or vocals with slack key accompaniment (non-Hawaii residents eligible)
Ukulele Album of the Year:  Best ukulele performance (non-Hawaii residents eligible)

Technical categories
Liner Notes: Best achievement in album annotation
Graphics: Best achievement in album cover design

Adjudicated categories
Haku Mele:  (Composer's Award) Best first–released song or chant primarily in the Hawaiian language (non-Hawaii residents eligible)
Hawaiian Language Performance:  (Artist Award) Best performance in the Hawaiian language (non-Hawaii residents eligible)
Engineering Award:  Best technical achievement in a sound recording and mix–down
International Album of the Year:  Best performance by non-U.S. performer(s) on an album or DVD whose tracks are at least 75% in the Hawaiian language or performed in slack key or Island Music styles

Award winners

Album of the Year
The Na Hoku Hanohano Awards for Album of the Year is presented by the Hawaii Academy of Recording Arts to honor artistic achievement, technical proficiency and overall excellence in the Hawaii recording industry. The Album of the Year award is the most prestigious award category at the Na Hoku Hanohano Awards.

2020s

Lifetime Achievement Award

Lifetime Achievement Legacy Recognition Honorees

See also
Hawaiian Music Hall of Fame
Music of Hawaii
Hawaii Music Awards

References

External links
Official website
Official Facebook page
Lists of all past Nā Hōkū Hanohano winners
Lists of winners

 
Organizations based in Hawaii
Hawaiian music
Annual television shows
Awards established in 1978
Music awards of Hawaii
1978 establishments in Hawaii
Music organizations based in the United States
Companies based in Honolulu
Hula